Dendropsophus stingi is a species of frogs in the family Hylidae. It is endemic to Colombia and occurs on the eastern slope of the Cordillera Oriental in the Boyacá Department. The species was named after celebrity musician Sting in recognition of his "commitment and efforts to save the rain forest". Despite this, common name Kaplan's Garagoa treefrog has been coined for it (the type locality is near Garagoa).

Description
Males in the type series measure  and the single female  in snout–vent length. The body is robust and the head is relatively wide. The snout is generally rounded, but in the female it is longer and acute in dorsal view. The tympanum is distinct. The fingers have wide discs and some webbing. The toes are 3/4 webbed. Skin is smooth except for the belly. The dorsum and head are pale to dark brown; there is a dark interorbital spot and two dark, chevron-shaped bands with black rims. Concealed surfaces of the limbs are pale yellowish brown and the belly is pale yellow cream.

Habitat and conservation
No major threats to this species have been identified. It is locally common but its known range is small, making it vulnerable to stochastic events.

References

stingi
Amphibians of Colombia
Endemic fauna of Colombia
Sting (musician)
Amphibians described in 1994
Taxonomy articles created by Polbot